Qi Zhengjun (born 1924) is a retired lieutenant general in the People's Liberation Army of China.

Biography
Qi was born in Wan County, Zhili (now Shunping County, Hebei), in 1924. He joined the Chinese Communist Party (CCP) in 1938, and enlisted in the Eighth Route Army in 1941. He mainly served in the Shanxi-Chahar-Hebei Military Region and participated in the Pingjin campaign during the Chinese Civil War.

In 1950 in the Korean War, he was assigned to the North Korea as chief of the Operation Section of a division of the People's Volunteer Army. After the war, he successively served in the PLA Academy of Military Sciences, the Nanjing Military Region, the Nanjing Senior Army School, and the Army Command College of the Chinese People's Liberation Army. He attained the rank of lieutenant general (zhongjiang) in 1988.

References

1924 births
Living people
People from Shunping County
People's Liberation Army generals from Hebei